Prior Jackson Homeplace, also known as Cedar Lawn and Fern Valley, is a historic home located near Fayette, Howard County, Missouri.  It was built about 1856, and is a two-story, three bay, Classical Revival style red brick dwelling with a two-story rear wing with an enclosed gallery porch.  It measures 51 feet by 44 feet and has a pitched hipped roof.

It was listed on the National Register of Historic Places in 1980.

References

Houses on the National Register of Historic Places in Missouri
Neoclassical architecture in Missouri
Houses completed in 1856
Buildings and structures in Howard County, Missouri
National Register of Historic Places in Howard County, Missouri